Mongolian wrestling, known as Bökh (Mongolian Cyrillic: Бөх or Үндэсний бөх), is the folk wrestling style of Mongols in Mongolia, Inner Mongolia  and other regions where touching the ground with anything other than a foot loses the match. Bökh means "firmness, reliability, vitality, wrestler", from Mongolic root *bekü "firm, hard, solid; fighter, strong man" possibly from Turkic *böke "warrior" < "big snake". Wrestling is the most important of the Mongolian culture's historic "Three Manly Skills", that also include horsemanship and archery.
Genghis Khan considered wrestling to be an important way to keep his army in good physical shape and combat ready. The court of the Qing dynasty (1646–1911) held regular wrestling events, mainly between ethnic Manchu and Mongol wrestlers. 
There are several different versions, Mongolian, Buryatian (in the Buryatia of Russia), Oirat and Inner Mongolian.

 Khalkha bökh, Mongolian wrestling, Khalkha wrestling  - traditional Khalkha Mongolian wrestling.
 Buryat wrestling (Buriad bökh)
 Bukh noololdoon - Oirat wrestling or Western Mongolian wrestling
 Southern Mongolian wrestling - (Khorchin wrestling) jacket wrestling that wear jacket made of cow leather, long pants with chaps over and boots.  
 Khuresh - traditional Tuvan jacket wrestling, in southern Siberia. Influenced by Mongolian wrestling. Khalkha Mongolian and Tuvan wrestlers wear almost the same jacket.

History 

 

Cave paintings in the Bayankhongor Province of Mongolia dating back to Neolithic age of 7000BC show grappling of two naked men and surrounded by crowds. The art of Bökh appears on bronze plates discovered in the ruins of the Xiongnu empire (206 BC–220 AD). Originally, Bökh was a military sport intended to provide mainly strength, stamina and skills training to troops. Genghis Khan (1206–1227) and the all later Emperors of the Mongol Empire (1206–1368) and also the Emperors of later Khanates were keen to support the sport for this reason so wrestling events were included in local festivals, or Naadam. Wrestling became a key factor when deciding the candidate rankings in imperial martial exams plus outstanding wrestlers were entitled to high distinctions.

The Secret History of the Mongols (written in Mongolian in 1240 AD) in Chapter 4, Paragraph 140 records a wrestling match between Buri the Wrestler and Belgutei that took place in Eastern Mongolia on the Year of the Monkey (1200 AD):

Axel Heikel of the Finnish expedition to Mongolia wrote about a wrestling competition the expedition witnessed during their ten-day stay in Urga (now Ulaanbaatar, capital of Mongolia) from 27 July until 7 August 1891: 

 
As can be seen from this text the Urga games (1778–1924) took place at the old central square which would have been located just to the north of present-day Sükhbaatar Square. The square can be seen on pre-revolutionary paintings of Urga. A 1967 Mongolian painting shows an old Urga wrestling match in detail, with the wrestlers wearing the same "Zodog" and "Shuudag" as they do in the present-day games (1924–present). The avarga (Titan) Jambyn Sharavjamts (born 1876) was a famous champion who gained recognition starting from when he was 18 years old and continued to compete with extraordinary success in state Naadams during the Qing dynasty period (until 1911), the Bogd Khan period (1911–1924) and the People's Republic of Mongolia (1924–1990). Sharavjamts was invited to take part in the state Naadam of 1945 (footage still exists) and succeeded in defeating three wrestlers at the age of nearly 70. He retired from wrestling in 1951, during the 30th anniversary of the People's Revolution with many decorations and medals including the Labor Achievement medal.

On 17 September 2011 the Mongolian National Wrestling Match was held with the attendance of 6002 wrestlers. Thus, it has become the largest wrestling competition in the world and is recorded in the Guinness Record Book.

Competitions 
Mongolian wrestling is the most popular national sport and a vital cultural piece for all Mongols around the world. When a male child is born in a family, Mongols wish him to become a wrestler. There are many competitions that take place each year in Mongolia, west and south-eastern Russia and northern China. The biggest one is the National Naadam festival, takes place in Mongolia between up to 1024 wrestlers.

Mongolian National Naadam 
In Mongolia, the Naadam ('Game' in English) take place in July each year.
The biggest competition is National Naadam competition in Ulaanbaatar that has the largest number of wrestlers and live radio and television broadcasts throughout the country. Naadam is divided into three classes based on the Mongolian administrative divisions. 

For the Naadam of Ulaanbaatar, the matches are held in a large stadium, while in countryside for smaller scale Naadams the matches are generally held in a small stadium or on an open grassy field; however they can also occur on a soft dirt area not littered with gravel. Since there are no weight classes in the Naadam of Mongolia, a small wrestler can compete against an opponent over twice his size. Smallest wrestlers usually weigh around 70 kg, while the biggest are over 160 kg, the median weight of a competitor at the Naadam is around 115 kg.

Traditionally the wrestlers were not randomly matched through like a drawing. The host of the Naadam had the privilege to arrange these matches and would often lend their favorites an advantage. Sometimes such arrangements would result in serious disputes between hosts and visiting wrestlers. Although the modern wrestling codes since 1980 stipulate that a lot drawing method be used, but this is usually only done at major cross-regional Naadams and championship matches. At the grassroots level the traditional system is still used.

Rank can only be attained during the Naadam festival. The number of rounds won by each wrestler determines rank. The lowest rank is the Falcon of Sum, given to the top four wrestlers at the soum level Naadam in any 329 sums of Mongolia. Highest rank is "Champion." The rank is held for life.

If the wrestler achieves the same rank two years in a row the rank is decorated. For example, a second time winner of the aimag level Naadam two years in a row would become a Hurts Arslan (Sharp Lion).

Danshig Naadam 
Danshig Naadams are smaller scale tournaments than the national naadam, usually with 256 or 128 competitors, organized once in a year or so in countrysides to celebrate specific anniversaries of provinces or historic locations. It is unique a type of naadam and smaller in scale than the most provincial tournaments. For example, the western region danshig, Khangai region danshig, Gobi region danshig, eastern region Danshig naadams are organized every two years.

Altargan 
Buryat Mongols also celebrate their own Naadam each year with their own wrestling style. Competitors come from different regions of Mongolia that has significant Buryat populations such as Dornod, Khentii, Selenge, Bulgan, Orkhon, also from Buryatia of Russia and from Inner Mongolia of China.

In 2010 the festival took place in late July in Ulaanbaatar, Mongolia. Wrestlers competed in two weight divisions -75 kg and +75 kg. For the lighter weight, B.Batozhargal of Buryatia got the title out of 32 wrestlers and for the heavier division D.Tsogzoldorj of Mongolia (who has the National Nachin rank) got his third title in row for the past three years.

All ethnic Mongol Wrestling Tournament
Since 2009, the associations of Mongol wrestling in Mongolia, Russia and China have started Mongol Wrestling Tournament between all ethnic Mongols. The International Mongol Bukh Federation (IMongolBökhF) is a non-profit organization that provides international standards and guidelines for the development of Mongol bukh for all over the world. The president of AEMWF is Inner Mongolian businessman Buhee Juramt; and the Japanese sumo wrestler, 68th yokozuna Asashoryu D. Dagvadorj is honorary president of AEMWF.

Participants come from Mongolia, Tuva of Russia, Buryatia of Russia, Kalmyk of Russia, Altai of Russia, Inner Mongolia of China and Xinjiang of China to compete with each other in Khalkha Wrestling style.  The first ever championship was held in Ulaanbaatar, Mongolia in April 2009, where Chimedregzengiin Sanjaadamba, who has not gotten yet a nation title, won the tournament. In August 2009, it was held in Xiliin hot of Inner Mongolia and again Sanjaadamba won the championship, while still without a national title.

The 2010 competition took place on 15–17 July at Ulan-Ude of Buryatia, Russia. This time, two weight categories have been created: -75 kg and +75 kg. In -75 kg division, about 45 wrestlers have competed and at the 5th round top four were: Ivan Garmaev (Buryatia), Kh. Munkhbayar (Mongolia), M. Batmunkh (Mongolia), Syldys Mongush (Tuva). Eventually Syldys Mongush got the title on the 6th round through Kh. Munkhbayar. For the +75 kg division, there were about the same number of competitors as in the lighter division. The top two were Ch. Sanjaadamba (Lion of the Army) and D. Ragchaa (Elephant of the Nation). And again Sanjaadamba got the title, who lost in the third round of this year's Naadam in Mongolia, where he failed to get a national-level title.

The fourth all ethnic Mongols' wrestling tournament held in 2011 was organized in Tuva republic, Russia, where ulsin khartsaga (State Falcon) A. Byambajav was declared as the winner.

The fifth all ethnic Mongols' tournament was held at the Mongolian national Asa circus, Ulaanbaatar, Mongolia on November 4, 2012, that aimed to introduce and promote Mongolian traditional wrestling for its consecutive fourth year. 
In the 5th all ethnic Mongols' wrestling tournament, ulsiin zaan (State Elephant) Ch. Sanjaadamba won the tournament in +85 kg weight category, where ulsin nachin (State Falcon) Erdenebileg Enkhbat was runner-up. In the -85 kg category, a Bulgan aimag resident, aimagiin arslan (Aimag Lion) Delgersaikhan Amarsaikhan took the first place; followed by an Uvurkhanggai resident wrestler, the aimgiin arslan (Aimag Falcon) Orgodol Tumendemberel.
The winners of each category were awarded with 7 million MNT, runner-ups with 4 million MNT, and the third and fourth place wrestlers were granted 1.5 million MNT respectively.

Other tournaments 

Each year during the Lunar New year holiday of Mongolia, 256 wrestlers compete during the winter at the Wrestling Palace in Ulaanbaatar. No rank is given at this competition, but it is considered the second most important tournament after the Naadam of Mongolia. Winners of this New Year's tournament are often considered likely to win the summer Naadam.

Best wrestlers from each 21 aimag of Mongolia hold an annual team wrestling competition. Often teams from Khangai region and north western region (Arkhangai, Övörkhangai and Uvs) win the title, but for the 2010 competition the team from Govi-Altai aimag took the title.

There are also smaller scale tournaments throughout the year that take place at the Wrestling Palace in Ulaanbaatar, usually in October, November, May and June with 64 or 128 wrestlers.

Government organizations or sometimes even big companies also host smaller scale competitions between 32 and 64 wrestlers to celebrate like anniversaries or special occasions. This really shows how important wrestling is to Mongolian lifestyle.

Match rules 

The goal of a match is to get your opponent to touch his upper body, knee or elbow to the ground. In the Inner Mongolian version, any body part other than the feet touching the ground signals defeat. There are no weight classes, age limits, or time limits in a match. It is not uncommon to see a toddler wrestling a grown man during the Mongolian Naadam???. Especially in Naadam, although there are no time limits for a bout, it is generally understood that a match shouldn't take a very long time, especially in the lower rounds. For example, it used to take more than an hour or two for a bout to finish, especially in the higher rounds with each wrestler trying to get feel of the other. This lately resulted in a policy that allows the zasuuls of the wrestlers to set up fair grip positions between the wrestlers to finish the bout faster if the match is moving slowly. Each wrestler wrestles once per round with the winner moving on the next round and the loser being eliminated from the competition.

The technical rules between the Mongolian version and what is found in Inner Mongolia have some divergence. In both versions a variety of throws, trips and lifts are employed to topple the opponent. The Inner Mongolians may not touch their opponent's legs with their hands, whereas, in Mongolia, grabbing your opponent's legs is legal. In addition, striking, choking or locking is illegal in both varieties.

Zasuul
The Zasuul (literally meaning a "fixer") of the wrestler is an on-field guide and coach of the wrestler. In lower round competitions when there are many wrestlers, most wrestlers don't have their own zasuuls. Successful wrestlers and those that get to the higher rounds get their own zasuuls. A Zasuuls' role is to hold the hat of his wrestler while he wrestles and give him encouragement and motivation on the field.  For instance, if the match is going slowly, a zasuul might slap the buttocks of his wrestler to encourage him to engage his opponent faster. Zasuuls are not technically coaches in the literal sense. They are usually an elder and a friend of the wrestler who is there on the field to serve as a guide and help set up a fair competition.  Also, unlike other grappling sports, a Zasuul does not have to be a former wrestler. When the match starts, the wrestlers are divided about  evenly into left and right sides, and sometimes a zasuul will sing a praise of his wrestler to open a challenge from that side in the higher rounds, and the other side's zasuul will also respond with his own praise of his wrestler. The poetic praise of a wrestler by his zasuul comes from the wrestler with the highest rank on that side.

Starting the match
Ordos, Alagshaa/Shalbur and Oirad wrestlers begin a match locked together, while the Ujumchin, Halh and Hulunbuir styles start a bout without physical contact.

Leg contact 
The Ujumchin and Hulunbuir styles permit no moves between the legs and hands, whereas the Halh variant not only allows but requires grabbing the opponent's legs.

Kicking 
A Hulunbuir wrestler may kick his opponent directly in the legs but that technique is not sanctioned by the other styles and is banned in the official code.

Falls 
Definitions of a "fall" varies between regions:

The Oirad in Xinjiang defines a fall as being when the shoulder blades touch the ground, which is similarly to the Turkish and International freestyle wrestling rules. The Inner Mongol style, shared by Hulunbuir, Ordos and Alagshaa/Shalbur styles, considers a fall to have occurred as soon as any part of the body above the knee (or ankle) touches the ground. The Halh variant, however, allows a hand to touch the ground without losing a bout.

Training
In preparation for the summer Naadam festivals, most of the wrestlers usually go to a training camp in the countryside where they set up their yurts or visit a family that they trained in their spot for years. All the higher ranked wrestlers usually separate out into their own individual camps that they host and lower ranked wrestlers and prospects usually join their camps to learn, observe and train over the course of the summer to get ready for the games.

Match courtesy
Mongolian wrestling also has certain codes of conduct that concern more with good sportsmanship. For example, when a wrestler's clothes get loose or entangled, his opponent is expected to stop attacking and help the former to re-arrange them—even though it might mean giving up a good winning opportunity. Also, when one contestant throws the other to the ground, he is supposed to help the latter get back on his feet, before he dances his way out of the field. After a bout one of the wrestlers go under the other's arm to formally conclude the match. Whether winning or losing, good manners dictate that the two opponents shake hands and salute each other and the audience, both prior to and after a bout.

Outfit
The outfit of the wrestler has been developed over the ages to reflect simplicity and mobility. The standard gear of a wrestler includes:

Zodog
A tight, collarless, heavy-duty short-sleeved jacket of red or blue color. Traditionally made of wool, modern wrestlers have changed to lighter materials such as cotton and silk. It is fastened at the back with a simple knotted string, and the front is cut away, leaving the wrestler's chest exposed. According to legend, on one occasion a wrestler defeated all other combatants and ripped open the zodog to reveal her breasts, showing to all she was a woman. From that day, the zodog had to reveal the wrestler's chest.

Shuudag
Small, tight-fitting briefs made of red or blue colored cotton cloth. These make the wrestler more mobile. Also, they prevent one's rival from easily taking advantage of long pants or to avoid material to trip upon.

Gutal
Leather boots, either in traditional style (with slightly upturned toes), or commercial, Western style. The traditional style gutal are often reinforced around the sides with leather strings for the purpose of wrestling.

Inner Mongolian wrestlers may also wear a jangga, a necklace decorated with strands of colorful silk ribbons. It is awarded to those who have gained considerable renown through contests.

Dance
One of the defining features of bökh is a dance wrestlers perform as they enter the contest field and exiting at the end.

Different locales have different dancing styles. In Mongolia the wrestler imitates falcons or phoenix taking off (devee). In Inner Mongolia, the dance is supposed to be a mimicking of lions or tigers prancing (magshikh)--as represented by the Üjümchin version.

Another major variation, popular among Mongols of Inner Mongolia's northeastern Khülünbüir region, resembles deer bounding (kharailtaa). All considered, the Üjümchin "magshikh" dance seems more strikingly robust-looking, partly due to the wrestler's dazzling apparel and partly the style of the dance itself. In contrast, the phoenix style of Mongolia appears to exhibit a greater degree of elegance.

Mongol wrestling dance has its original forms in shamanistic rituals where people imitated movements of various animals. Today, apart from its aesthetic value, the dance is also regarded as a warm-up and cool-down procedure before and after an intense fight. Good wrestlers treat the dance with great earnest and are often better dancers.

Thanks to wrestling activists' tireless and ingenious efforts, this unique dance has become one of the integral and indispensable aspect of the wrestling tradition as a whole. In Inner Mongolia it has been, together with uriya, the costume, and the various rules, codified in the first wrestling Competitions Rules finalized in the late 1980s.

Successful wrestlers

Historically the most successful wrestler is recorded as Namkhai who won the Naadam 19 times and 7 times finished second. He got his first Naadam win in 1895.

Only 20 wrestlers reached Giant rank in modern era (since 1921). Badmaanyambuugiin Bat-Erdene is considered to be the most successful wrestler in the modern era with 11 championship wins. He also won Naadam for the 750th anniversary of the Secret History of the Mongols in 1990.

Most successful wrestlers are:

See also 
Mongolia at the Olympics

References 

Folk wrestling styles
Sport in Mongolia
Sports originating in Mongolia
Wrestling in Mongolia